Oleg Goroshko (born November 19, 1989) is a Belarusian professional ice hockey player who is currently playing for HC Dinamo Minsk in the Kontinental Hockey League (KHL).

He participated in the 2011 IIHF World Championship as a member of the Belarus men's national ice hockey team.

External links

1989 births
Belarusian ice hockey defencemen
HC Dinamo Minsk players
HK Neman Grodno players
Living people
Sportspeople from Grodno